L'Hôtellerie portugaise is an opéra comique in 1 act by Luigi Cherubini. The opera uses a French language libretto by Étienne Aignan. The work premiered on 25 July 1798 in Paris at the Théâtre Feydeau.

Roles

References

Operas
Operas by Luigi Cherubini
French-language operas
Opéras comiques
1798 operas